Why England Slept (1940) is the published version of a thesis written by John F. Kennedy in his senior year at Harvard College. Its title is an allusion to Winston Churchill's 1938 book While England Slept, which also examined the buildup of German power. Kennedy's book examines the failures of the British government to take steps to prevent World War II and its initial lack of response to Adolf Hitler's threats of war.

Rather than castigating the popular appeasement policy that the British government then pursued, it is notable for taking the uncommon stance that if Great Britain had confronted Nazi Germany earlier it would have been far more disastrous for her than the delay caused by the appeasement policies of Chamberlain and other British leaders.

Publication

The book was originally intended to be no more than a college thesis. It was rated magna cum laude by Professor Henry A. Yeomans and cum laude plus by Professor Carl J. Friedrich. However, Kennedy's father, Joseph P. Kennedy, Sr., keen to elevate his son's reputation, encouraged Kennedy to convert the thesis into book form and publish it. He then enlisted the highly influential publishing magnate Henry Luce to write the foreword, and his friend Arthur Krock, former bureau chief of The New York Times, to assist in redrafting the thesis, which had originally been titled "Appeasement At Munich."

The historian Garry Wills claimed that the assistance amounted to rewriting and retitling the manuscript and finding an agent for its publication. As United States ambassador to the United Kingdom, Kennedy, Sr. supported British Prime Minister Neville Chamberlain's policy of appeasement during the late 1930s.  His stance furthering appeasement would eventually cause Kennedy Sr.'s removal as English ambassador, and prove disastrous for his future political aspirations.  By contrast, John F. Kennedy broke with his father's support for appeasement, and was moved when he witnessed firsthand the Luftwaffe's bombings of Britain.

Reception
After it was published in 1940, the book sold 80,000 copies in the United Kingdom and the United States and collected $40,000 in royalties for Kennedy. Income from the British sales were donated to Plymouth, a British city that had recently been bombed by the Luftwaffe. Kennedy bought a Buick convertible with the income from the book's North American sales.

Joseph Kennedy had initially approached Harold Laski to write the book's foreword, but Laski declined since he felt that it was "the book of an immature mind; that if it hadn't been written by the son of a very rich man, he wouldn't have found a publisher."

Analysis
The book addressed Kennedy's belief in the need for objective and detached calculation in foreign policy decisions. Kennedy historian and foreign relations professor Fredrik Logevall believed the book demonstrates JFK's "commitment to an unsentimental realism in international affairs". Kennedy is telling future policy makers that "foreign threats cannot be dealt with by ignoring them or wishing them away... they must be confronted by clearheaded and informed calculation".

References

External links 
Why England Slept New York: W. Funk, 1940

1940 non-fiction books
Books about foreign relations of the United Kingdom
Books about international relations
Books about politics of the United Kingdom
Books by John F. Kennedy
Non-fiction books about diplomacy
Theses
Books about World War II
Books written by presidents of the United States